The 2021 Erovnuli Liga or Crystalbet Erovnuli Liga 2021 (formerly known as Umaglesi Liga) is the 33rd season of top-tier football in Georgia. Dinamo Tbilisi are the defending champions. The season began on 27 February 2021 and is scheduled to end on 4 December 2021. The league winners will earn a place in the UEFA Champions League and the second and third-placed clubs will earn a place in the UEFA Europa Conference League.

Teams and stadiums

Changes
Shukura (promoted after a three-year absence) and Samgurali Tsqaltubo (promoted after an eighteen-year absence) were promoted from the 2020 Erovnuli Liga 2. Chikhura (relegated after eight years in the top flight) and Merani Tbilisi (relegated after one year in the top flight) have been relegated to 2021 Erovnuli Liga 2.

Personnel and kits

League table

Results
Each team will play the other nine teams home and away twice, for a total of 36 games each.

Round 1-18

Round 19-36

Relegation play-offs

Season statistics

Top scorers

References

Erovnuli Liga seasons
1
Georgia
Georgia